Slowly but Surely is a studio album by singer-songwriter Holly Golightly, released in 2004.

Track listing
Songs are by Holly Golightly unless otherwise indicated.
 
 "On the Fire"
 "The Luckiest Girl"
 "My Love Is" (Billy Myles)
 "Keeping On"
 "Always and Forever"
 "Dear John"
 "In Your Head"
 "Slowly but Surely" (Ollie Jones, Randy Hobbs)
 "Through the Sun and Wine"
 "All Grown Up"
 "Won't Come Between"
 "Mother Earth" (Peter Chatman, Louis Simpkins)

Credits
 Holly Golightly – vocals and rhythm guitar
 Ed Deegan  – Lead guitar and bottleneck
 Matt Radford – Double bass
 Bruce Brand – drums and percussion
 The Bongolian – Organ, piano and percussion
 Little Ed – Guitar and sitar
 Baine Watson – 6-string bass

References

2004 albums
Holly Golightly (singer) albums
Damaged Goods (record label) albums
Albums produced by Liam Watson (record producer)